

Area code 218 is a telephone area code in the North American Numbering Plan (NANP)  for the northern part of the U.S. state of Minnesota. It is assigned to the largest of Minnesota's original two numbering plan areas (NPAs), although its geographical boundaries have been modified since inception. It comprises roughly the northern half of the state, and includes the cities of Duluth, Hibbing, Brainerd, Bemidji, Fergus Falls, and Moorhead.

History

In the initial 1947 map of the North American Numbering Plan, area code 218 was conceived as an r-shaped area in the northern and western two-thirds of Minnesota. The southeastern portion, including the Twin Cities, was located in area code 612.

As the implementation of the new telephone numbering plan proceeded, the Minnesota area code boundaries were redrawn in 1954 to avoid cutting across major toll traffic routes out of the Twin Cities.
This resulted in three area codes, with 218 covering the northern band of the state, 612 covering the central band, and the new area code 507 forming a southern band. The southern portion of the old 218 (Worthington, Marshall, and Pipestone), was merged with the southern portion of 612 to form the new 507, which ran along the entire length of the Iowa border. 612 was rotated to stretch from the Wisconsin border to the South Dakota border, absorbing a slice of the old 218 (St. Cloud, Alexandria, Appleton). 218 was pushed into east-central Minnesota, absorbing the old 612's eastern portion and taking on roughly its present shape.

A small change in the 1990s brought the Northwest Angle into the 218 area code; that region had previously been part of Bell Canada's Clearwater Bay exchange in area code 807.

Because of the low population density in northern Minnesota, the region was unaffected when the 612 area was subdivided in 1996. The resulting area code 320, the former western portion of 612, runs the length of the southern border with 218, and the 612 area code has been reduced in size so much that it now just includes the city of Minneapolis and a few nearby suburbs.

The western portion of 218, generally everything from Brainerd westward, shares a LATA with the eastern half of North Dakota, including Fargo and Grand Forks.

Exhaust Projections by the NANP Administrator estimate that northern Minnesota will not need another area code until about 2028.

Prior to October 2021, area code 218 had telephone numbers assigned for the central office code 988. In 2020, 988 was designated nationwide as a dialing code for the National Suicide Prevention Lifeline, which created a conflict for exchanges that permit seven-digit dialing. This area code was therefore scheduled to transition to ten-digit dialing by October 24, 2021.

Cities and communities

Ada
Aitkin
Akeley
Ashby
Aurora
Babbitt
Backus
Bagley
Barnesville
Barnum
Battle Lake
Baudette
Baxter
Bemidji
Bena
Big Falls
Bigfork
Biwabik
Bovey
Boy River
Brainerd
Breckenridge
Brookston
Carlton
Cass Lake
Chisholm
Clearbrook
Cloquet
Cohasset
Coleraine
Cook
Cromwell
Crookston
Crosby
Dalton
Deer River
Deerwood
Detroit Lakes
Dilworth
Duluth
East Grand Forks
Elbow Lake
Ely
Emily
Erhard
Erskine
Eveleth
Federal Dam
Fergus Falls
Fertile
Floodwood
Fosston
Frazee
Gilbert
Glyndon
Grand Marais
Grand Portage
Grand Rapids
Greenbush
Hackensack
Hallock
Hawley
Hermantown
Hibbing
Hill City
Hoyt Lakes
Humboldt
International Falls
Karlstad
Keewatin
Littlefork
Longville
Lutsen
Mahnomen
McGregor
Menahga
Mizpah
Moorhead
Moose Lake
Motley
Mountain Iron
Nashwauk
Newfolden
New York Mills
Northome
Nisswa
Outing
Orr
Park Rapids
Parkers Prairie
Pelican Rapids
Pequot Lakes
Perham
Pine River
Proctor
Red Lake Falls
Remer
Roseau
Rothsay
St. Hilaire
St. Vincent
Sebeka
Silver Bay
Staples
Sturgeon Lake
Thief River Falls
Thomson
Tower
Twin Valley
Two Harbors
Vergas
Virginia
Wadena
Walker
Warren
Warroad
Wawina
Willow River
Wrenshall

See also
 List of NANP area codes

External links

List of exchanges from AreaCodeDownload.com, 218 Area Code

References

Area code history.  AreaCode-Info.com.
(2001). 1947 Area Code Assignment Map. GIF image at AreaCode-Info.com.

218
218
Telecommunications-related introductions in 1947